Alikovo (Elĕk) is a rural locality (a selo) and the administrative center of Alikovsky District of the Chuvash Republic, Russia, located  south of Cheboksary, on the Cheboksary—Krasnye Chetai and Cheboksary—Yadrin auto routes. Population:  The majority of the population is Chuvash.

Geography
The Abashyrma River flows near Alikovo. The closest village is Siner.

History
It was first mentioned in 1486.

Climate
The climate is moderately continental, with long cold winters and warm summers.

Economy
Industry in Alikovo is represented by a construction plant, branches of banks and insurance companies, telecommunication offices, and building companies.

Infrastructure
The facilities include a cultural center, a theatre, a library, a health clinic, and stores. There is also a postal office, a stadium, a restaurant and cafés, and several gas stations. A market is open on Thursdays. There is a park and a public garden named after Andriyan Nikolayev.

Education
Educational facilities include a middle school and a music school.

Culture
Cultural facilities include a museum, a people's theater, a people's ensemble, a veteran's orchestra, a school's brass band, and a chorus. International Chuvash music festival "Viryal shevlisem" (lit. Viryal's pancakes) is held each May.

A newspaper is published in Alikovo.

Religion
Church of the Assumption of the Virgin (Alikovo)

Further reading
L. A. Yefimov, "Alikovsky District" ("Элӗк Енӗ"), Alikovo, 1994.
"Аликовская энциклопедия" (Alikovsky District's Encyclopedia), authors: Yefimov L.A., Yefimov E.L., Ananyev A.A., Terentyev G.K., Cheboksary, 2009, .

References

Rural localities in Chuvashia
Alikovsky District
Kurmyshsky Uyezd